Konstantyna Malytska or Rastyk; Vira Lebedova; Chaika Dnistrova (30 May 1872 – 17 March 1947) was a Ukrainian educator, writer, and activist.

Life
Malytska was born in Kropyvnyk in Kalush Raion in 1872. She studied to be a teacher and graduated in 1892. She taught elementary education in Halych and Luzhany and also in Lviv at the Shevchenko Girls' School.

In 1912, she organized a meeting for the "Women's Committee" in Lviv to prepare for the war that she saw as inevitable. Others at the meeting were Olena Stepaniv, Maria Biletska (1864-1937) and Olha Basarab. The money raised from the "National Combat Fund", they created, was used to fund the Ukrainian Sich Riflemen and Stepaniv would be its first female officer.

In 1938, the Polish rulers in Ukraine made the Ukrainian Women's Union illegal. As a result, another women's organization, the Druzhyna Kniahyni Olhy (Company of Prinncess Ohla), was formed and Marytska became one of its leaders. The organisation's new existence was brief, as it disappeared when the Soviets occupied Galicia in 1939.

In the summer of 1941, she initiated the founding of the Women's Service to Ukraine society and headed it until September 1941.

Writing
Malytska wrote children's plays, songs and for magazine contributions. In 1899 she published children's stories in Mali druzi (Little Friends, 1899, 1906) and her articles about education in Maty (Mother, 1902) and Z trahedii dytiachykh dush (From the Tragedies of Children's Souls, 1907).

Death
Malytska died in Lviv in 1947.

References

1872 births
1947 deaths
People from Ivano-Frankivsk Oblast
Ukrainian women educators
Ukrainian educators
Ukrainian children's writers
19th-century Ukrainian women writers
20th-century Ukrainian women writers
Ukrainian women's rights activists